Arabs in Japan consist of Arab migrants that come to Japan, as well as their descendants. In December 2016, there were 6,037 Arabs living in Japan.

History

Early history 
There are isolated records of contact between Arab countries and Japan before the opening of the country in 1853. Some elements of Islamic philosophy were also distilled as far as back as the Heian period. Early European accounts of Muslims and their contacts with Japan were maintained by Portuguese sailors who mention a passenger aboard their ship, an Arab who had preached Islam to the people of Japan. He had sailed to the islands in Malacca in 1555.

Notable people
Sultan Nour, politician (Syrian parents)
Carlos Ghosn, businessman (Lebanese parents)
Mei Shigenobu, journalist (Palestinian/Lebanese father)
Ken Noguchi, mountaineer (Egyptian mother)
Erika Sawajiri, actress (French mother, raised in Japan)
Osama el-Samni, soccer player (Egyptian father)
Fairouz Ai, voice actress (Egyptian father, raised in Egypt and Japan)

References 

Arab diaspora in Asia
Ethnic groups in Japan